The term) is used in Italian cuisine to refer to a recipe for poached white fish, or to simply refer to the lightly herbed broth used to poach it. There are many different variations of this sauce, from light broths, to thick tomato based sauces, which have been found on all types of seafood (not just the traditional white fish), and even chicken.
This dish is comparable to other Italian dishes, such as: cioppino, cacciucco and guazzetto.

Origin
While the dish originated from fishermen of the Neapolitan area, who would sautée the catch of the day in seawater together with tomatoes and extra virgin olive oil, the term itself most likely originated from Tuscany; Mezzadria peasants would make wine, but had to give most to the landlord, leaving little left for them to drink. The peasants were resourceful, however, and mixed the stems, seeds, and pomace left over from the wine production with large quantities of water, brought it to a boil, then hermetically sealed in a terracotta vase and fermented it for several days. Called l'acquarello or l'acqua pazza, the result was a water barely colored with wine, which the fisherman may have been reminded of when seeing the broth of the dish, colored slightly red by the tomatoes and oil.

Acqua pazza became a very popular dish with tourists on Capri Island in the 1960s.

Ingredients
Aside from the white fish (bass, cod, halibut, sea bream, sea bass, sea perch, etc.) the standard ingredients are: 
pomodorini (cherry tomatoes)
water
salt
olive oil (preferably extra virgin)

However, a large variety of other ingredients can be used and substituted—for instance red snapper, shrimp, or even Maine lobster instead of white fish; vegetables such as garlic, celery, carrots, and scallions; and herbs and spices like pepper, capers, bay leaves, olives, parsley, fennel, and lemon. Some recipes also call for bread (for dipping in the broth).

Other uses
Many restaurants, such as the Acqua Pazza in San Marco, known for seafood and neapolitan pizzas, and Acqua Pazza in Bologna, which specializes in seafoods and sauces, either share the name with or are named after this dish.

See also

Acqua pazza (wine)
Italian cuisine
 List of Italian dishes
Nimono

References

External links
 Acqua pazza recipe with step by step pictures from annamariavolpi.com
 Red Snapper Acqua pazza recipe from Rachael Ray
 Gamberoni all'Acqua Pazza (Shrimp in Crazy Water) recipe from The Washington Post
 Maine Lobster Acqua Pazza recipe from oprah.com

Italian seafood dishes
Neapolitan cuisine